Silvio Padoin (9 April 1930 – 31 October 2019) was an Italian Roman Catholic bishop.

Padoin was born in Pieve di Soligo, Italy in April 1930 and was ordained to the priesthood in 1955. He served as bishop of the Roman Catholic Diocese of Pozzuoli, Italy, from 1993 to 2005.

Notes

1930 births
2019 deaths
20th-century Italian Roman Catholic bishops
21st-century Italian Roman Catholic bishops
People from Pieve di Soligo